The 1982 Haringey Council election took place on 6 May 1982 to elect members of Haringey London Borough Council in London, England. The whole council was up for election and the Labour party stayed in overall control of the council.

Background

Election result

|}

Ward results

Alexandra

Archway

Bowes Park

Bruce Grove

Coleraine

Crouch End

Terence O'Sullivan was a sitting councillor for Noel Park ward.

Fortis Green

Green Lanes

Harringay

High Cross

Highgate

Hornsey Central

Hornsey Vale

Muswell Hill

Noel Park

Park

Seven Sisters

South Hornsey

South Tottenham

Donald Billingsley was a sitting councillor for Bruce Grove ward.

Tottenham Central

George Meehan was a sitting councillor for Green Lanes ward.

West Green

White Hart Lane

Woodside

Frederick Neuner was a sitting councillor for Bowes Park ward.

References

1982
1982 London Borough council elections
May 1982 events in the United Kingdom